Oplomus mundus is a species of predatory stink bug in the family Pentatomidae. It is found in Central America and North America.

References

External links

 

Asopinae
Articles created by Qbugbot
Insects described in 1862
Hemiptera of Central America
Hemiptera of North America